Earley Franklin Poppleton (September 29, 1834 – May 6, 1899) was an American lawyer and politician who served one term as a U.S. Representative from Ohio from 1875 to 1877.

Biography 
Born in Bellville, Ohio, Poppleton pursued classical studies.
He was educated at the Ohio Wesleyan University at Delaware.
He studied law.
He was admitted to the bar and commenced law practice in Elyria, Ohio.
He moved to Delaware, Ohio, in 1861 and continued the practice of his profession.
He served as member of the State senate in 1870.

Congress 
Poppleton was elected as a Democrat to the Forty-fourth Congress (March 4, 1875 – March 3, 1877).
He was an unsuccessful candidate for reelection.
He resumed the practice of law.

Death
He died in Delaware, Ohio, May 6, 1899.
He was interred in Oak Grove Cemetery.

References

1834 births
1899 deaths
People from Delaware, Ohio
People from Bellville, Ohio
Ohio lawyers
Burials at Oak Grove Cemetery, Delaware, Ohio
Ohio Wesleyan University alumni
Democratic Party Ohio state senators
19th-century American politicians
19th-century American lawyers
Democratic Party members of the United States House of Representatives from Ohio